The corona rainbowfish (Melanotaenia corona) is a species of fish in the family Melanotaeniidae. It is endemic to West Papua in Indonesia. Only two specimens of this rainbowfish have ever been collected, both males from the Sermowai River in Irian Jaya, Indonesia, which were collected in 1911 by K. Gjellerup.

References

corona
Freshwater fish of Western New Guinea
Taxonomy articles created by Polbot
Fish described in 1982